The Fourth Colijn cabinet was the cabinet of the Netherlands from 24 June 1937 until 25 July 1939. The cabinet was formed by the political parties Roman Catholic State Party (RKSP), Anti-Revolutionary Party (ARP) and the Christian Historical Union (CHU) after the election of 1937. The right-wing cabinet was a majority government in the House of Representatives. It was the fourth of five cabinets of Hendrikus Colijn, the Leader of the Anti-Revolutionary Party as Prime Minister.

Cabinet Members

 Retained this position from the previous cabinet.
 Resigned.
 Served ad interim.

References

External links
Official

  Kabinet-Colijn IV Parlement & Politiek

Cabinets of the Netherlands
1937 establishments in the Netherlands
1939 disestablishments in the Netherlands
Cabinets established in 1937
Cabinets disestablished in 1939